The Ministry of Construction of Oil and Gas Industries (Minneftegazstroy) was a government ministry in the Soviet Union.

Created in 1972, this ministry was responsible for construction of pipelines, processing facilities and compressor and pumping stations.

List of ministers
Source:

References

Construction of Oil and Gas Industries